Three ships of the Royal Navy have borne the name HMS Doon:

  was a  launched in 1904 that served in World War I and was disposed of in 1919. 
  was a trawler hired between 1917 and 1919.
  was a  launched in 1917 as Fraser Eaves and renamed as Doon in 1920. She was sold in 1947

Royal Navy ship names